Kajar Lember (born 16 September 1976 in Kuressaare) is an Estonian politician. He has been member of XII Riigikogu.

He is a member of Estonian Social Democratic Party.

References

Living people
1976 births
Social Democratic Party (Estonia) politicians
Members of the Riigikogu, 2011–2015
University of Tartu alumni
People from Kuressaare